Haplidoeme punctata is a species of beetle in the family Cerambycidae. It was described by Chemsak and Linsley in 1971.

References

Oemini
Beetles described in 1971